Kleszczów may refer to the following places:
Kleszczów, Lesser Poland Voivodeship, south Poland
Kleszczów, Łódź Voivodeship, central Poland
Kleszczów, Silesian Voivodeship, south Poland